Guttenbrunn may refer to:

Guttenbrunn, the German name for Zăbrani, a commune in Arad County, Romania

People with the surname Guttenbrunn 
 Adam Müller-Guttenbrunn, Austrian author
 Ludwig Guttenbrunn, Austrian painter

See also
Gutenbrunn, municipality in Austria

German-language surnames